Soccer Bowl '78 was the North American Soccer League's championship final for the 1978 season. It was the fourth NASL championship under the Soccer Bowl name.

The match was played at Giants Stadium in the New York City suburb of East Rutherford, New Jersey on August 27 between the American Conference champion Tampa Bay Rowdies and the National Conference champion and defending Soccer Bowl champion New York Cosmos (who had dropped "New York" from their name to simply "Cosmos" for only the 1977–78 seasons). 

Seeing the large home crowds the Cosmos had drawn during the 1977 NASL season, the league awarded Soccer Bowl hosting duties to the club. The match drew a Soccer Bowl-record 74,901 fans, more than doubling the previous year's attendance at Portland's Civic Stadium. To date, it remains the largest crowd for a professional club soccer championship game in North America.

The Cosmos won the match by a 3–1 score, capturing their third league title and becoming the first repeat champion in NASL history.

Background

Tampa Bay Rowdies
The Rowdies started off 5-8, but would eventually tie the New England Tea Men for first place in the American Conference's Eastern Division with 165 points. New England won the division on the NASL's total wins tiebreaker (19 to the Rowdies' 18), and relegated Tampa Bay to fourth place in the American Conference's playoff standings. After beating the Chicago Sting in the first round, the San Diego Sockers were defeated by a Rodney Marsh overtime goal in a mini-game tiebreaker and the Fort Lauderdale Strikers fell in a mini-game shootout in the American Conference finals. It would be the Rowdies' second trip to the Soccer Bowl in four years. Marsh led Tampa Bay in scoring with 18 goals and 16 assists for 52 points, good for fourth in the league. Near the end of the deciding match between the Rowdies and Strikers, he had gotten spiked in the shin by Maurice Whittle of Fort Lauderdale. There was concern about his playing status, but all indications leading up to match day had looked positive.

New York Cosmos

While Tampa Bay encountered trouble on the way to Giants Stadium, the Cosmos hit cruise control in early May and never looked back. A 7–0 crushing of the Strikers in the team's opener heralded a run of dominance not seen in the NASL before. A 24-6 record and a league-high 212 points led to a first-place finish in the National Conference Eastern Division as the team looked to become the first back-to-back champions in NASL history. Giorgio Chinaglia's 34 goals and 79 points set league records. The Seattle Sounders fell at the first playoff hurdle, but the Minnesota Kicks proved to be quite a challenge. The Kicks won their playoff opener 9–2 behind Alan Willey's five goals to immediately put the Cosmos on the brink of elimination. However, a 4–0 win in the second game and a dramatic mini-game shootout victory helped the team from New York move on. Two shutout wins over the Portland Timbers in the National Conference championship allowed the Cosmos to become the only team in league history to play in the Soccer Bowl in their own stadium.

Broadcasters
The game was broadcast live in the United States on the TVS network. Jon Miller handled play-by-play duties, while Paul Gardner was the color analyst. This would be the final NASL game broadcast by the network, as the league signed a deal with ABC Sports in the fall of 1978. Gardner would continue as the color analyst for ABC's coverage, while Miller would move on to a long career announcing Major League Baseball.

Game summary
As it turned out, Marsh's shin injury had become infected and he was unable to play. An early-morning run in Central Park confirmed Tampa Bay's worst fears. The Cosmos didn't take advantage early, but Dennis Tueart's goal at 30:42 broke the deadlock. Defender Bob Iarusci broke up an offensive rush, saw Steve Hunt open for a pass and Hunt spotted Tueart standing unmarked to the left of Rowdie goalkeeper Winston DuBose and Tueart made it 1–0. Giorgio Chinaglia's 39th goal of the season made it 2–0 just before halftime. Hunt raced through the Rowdies defense, took a shot which DuBose saved, and the rebound came out to Chinaglia. The league's scoring leader put it away despite the presence of defender Mike Connell, who deflected the ball slightly with his head.

A Mirandinha goal got the Rowdies on the board with fresh hope and 17 minutes left. Tampa Bay midfielder David Robb, switched from forward to defense due to Frantz St. Lot's injury, stole a pass from Tueart in the Cosmos' end and found Mirandinha. The Brazilian fired a low shot off of the Giants Stadium post and past Cosmos goalie Jack Brand to halve the deficit. Tueart closed out the scoring four minutes later by taking a pass from Werner Roth and sliding it past the diving DuBose for the final 3–1 margin.

Dennis Tueart won Soccer Bowl MVP honors for his two-goal efforts, while Pino Wilson was named the defensive player of the game. After missing 10 games due to various injuries, Tueart led the NASL in playoff scoring with six goals and five assists for 17 points in six playoff games.

Match details

1978 NASL Champions: Cosmos

Television: TVSAnnouncers: Jon Miller, Paul Gardner

Match statistics

Bibliography

References

External links
 
 The Year in American Soccer – 1978

1978
 
August 1978 sports events in the United States
1978 in sports in New Jersey
1978
1978
Soccer in New Jersey